George Stephenson "Onkus" Wallace (4 June 1895 – 19 October 1960), was an Australian comedian, actor, vaudevillian and radio personality. During the early to mid-20th century, he was one of the most famous and successful Australian comedians on both stage and screen, with screen, song and revue sketch writing amongst his repertoire. Wallace was a small tubby man with goggle eyes, a mobile face and croaky voice who appeared in trademark baggy trousers, checkered shirt and felt hat. His career as one of Australia's most popular comedians spanned four decades from the 1920s to 1960 and encompassed stage, radio and film entertainment. Ken G. Hall, who directed him in two films, wrote in his autobiography that George Wallace was the finest Australian comedian he had known.

Early and personal life 
George Stephenson Wallace was born in Aberdeen, New South Wales to George Stevenson "Broncho" Wallace, a painter, and Catherine Mary Ann, née Scott. His father toured in minstrel shows, and George junior appeared at age three in a Sydney pantomime. He was in his parents' song-and-dance act until they divorced. He later busked in Pyrmont, New South Waleswaterfront, worked in his stepfather's ink factory, and was a farm-hand and canecutter in North Queensland. He then joined a road show at age sixteen.

Wallace married Margarita Edith Emma Nicholas on 3 January 1917 and moved to Sydney in 1918. Wallace worked at Newtown Bridge Theatre for £4 a week. Wallace used his wife in his act. Their two-year-old son join them in acrobatic poses. His parents separated in 1924.

Professional career 
In the 1919 he formed a double act with Jack 'Dinks' Patterson as "Dinks and Onkus" (The Two Drunks), created in the style of Stiffy and Mo The pair danced and sang, and for someone who looked like a wharfie (with his barrel chest and short legs) Wallace was surprisingly acrobatic and light on his feet, and the public loved him for his slapstick style and everyman appeal.

Turning solo, Wallace was soon snapped up by the Fuller circuit in Sydney and from there he moved to the Tivoli Theatre circuit. At Tivoli, he was teamed up with British actress, Jenny Howard. By the 1920s, he was considered to be one of the "Big Three" most popular performers in Australian comedy. He wrote all of his own scripts and in 1942 penned a song that was to become a World War II standard, "A Brown Slouch Hat with The Side Turned Up".

The 1930s saw George turn his talents to film. He starred in five films, all comedies and was the biggest, if not the biggest, Australian star. Three of these, His Royal Highness (1932), Harmony Row (1933) and A Ticket in Tatts (1934), were directed by F. W. Thring for Thring's company, Efftee Film Productions. Wallace was under contract to Efftee during this time for an estimated £3000 – £5000 per year, during which he also made stage appearances for the company.

He said in 1933 that he turned down an offer from Universal to film in the US.

The other two, Let George Do It (1938) and Gone to the Dogs (1939), were directed by Ken G. Hall for Cinesound Productions. Wallace's contributions to these films extended beyond his performances. He developed the concepts for His Royal Highness, Harmony Row and A Ticket in Tatts by drawing on his stage revues, and co-wrote Let George Do It and Gone to the Dogs. Wallace's other film work included a 1932 short film, "Oh! What a Night!", which he is said to have directed unofficially. In later years, he was seen in supporting roles in two dramatic films, The Rats of Tobruk (Charles Chauvel, 1944, Australia) and Wherever She Goes (Michael Gordon, 1953, USA/Australia).

Films 
The five feature films Wallace starred in are among the few surviving examples of his work. As the most sustained series of Australian comedian comedies produced before World War II, these films provide some support for the claim that George Wallace is Australia's equivalent of Charles Chaplin.

In his physical presentation as well as his performance style, George Wallace differed from international stars of slapstick comedy. For instance, his clothing and speech allude to an Australian working-class type and contrast with Charles Chaplin's mock-dapper Tramp persona. The fact that Wallace's performances combine tap-dancing with pratfalls makes him unusual among film comedians anywhere. Moreover, Wallace's films prefigure developments in Hollywood comedy. An example is the fictional country of Betonia in His Royal Highness, which predates satirical depictions of fictional nations in such celebrated films as The Marx Brothers' Duck Soup (1933) and Charles Chaplin's The Great Dictator (1940). Other aspects of Wallace's films that are relatively unusual for the period are the comedic treatment of haunted houses in Harmony Row and Gone to the Dogs and scientific experimentation in Gone to the Dogs, which emphasize the resourcefulness of Australian filmmaking in the face of Hollywood's international dominance.

George Wallace's transition from stage to screen parallels the career progressions of many internationally famous vaudeville performers in a period when movies' popularity was eclipsing live theatre. However, the financially struggling Australian film industry of the 1920s and 1930s provided fewer opportunities than Hollywood did.

Although Wallace continued to work after World War II, with a successful career in radio and on stage as well as occasional film roles, his film career never returned to its 1930s peak. This was undoubtedly influenced by factors outside his control, such as F. W. Thring's death in 1936 and Cinesound Productions' decision to cease feature film production in 1940. Indeed, the films that Wallace stars in defy the fact that the Australian film industry was already struggling to survive. These films continue to be a high point of Australian screen comedy.

Legacy and influence 
The films Wallace made with F. W. Thring influenced subsequent Australian comedians who successfully made the transition from stage to television and then film, such as Barry Humphries, Paul Hogan and the Frontline (Australian TV series) team. Unlike many Australian comedies made before World War II, Wallace's films do not celebrate the bush as "the essence of Australianness". Instead, these films are significant for reflecting Australian comedy's movement away from the bush to emphasise urban settings, which would become more prevalent in later Australian comedy. However, the full significance of Wallace's films in relation to later Australian screen comedy is perhaps yet to be understood.

His career as one of Australia's most popular comedians spanned four decades from the 1920s to 1960 and encompassed stage, radio and film entertainment. Ken G. Hall, who directed him in two films, wrote in his autobiography that George Wallace was the finest Australian comedian he had known.

In recent decades, George Wallace has been the subject of a documentary film, Funny By George: The George Wallace Story and a stage show about his life, Falling On My Left Ear: A Show About George Wallace.

Wallace died of chronic bronchitis and emphysema at his home in Kensington, New South Wales.

George Wallace had one child, George Leonard Wallace (George Wallace Jnr.), who became a famous comedian in his own right. He had considerable success on television in the late 1950s, and 1960s winning Logie Awards in 1962 and 1963. George Wallace Jnr's television show, Theatre Royal, which originated in Brisbane, won six Logie Awards from 1962 to 1967.

Filmography

Unmade films 
 Ginger Murdoch (1930s)

Select theatre credits 

 A Fireman's Troubles (1919) – Sydney
 Act with Jack Paterson, Dinks and Onkus (circa 1919–23) – Harry Clay Sydney suburban circuit
 Mulligan's Mixup (1921) – revusical
 Two Days Out (1921) – revusial
 In a Ballroom (1922) – revusical
 Over the Hills, Tally Ho (1922) – revusical
 Fullers Theatres New Zealand tour (1924)
 George Wallace Revue Company (1924–30) – revue – various
 A Dancing Delirium (1924) – revusical
 Some Night (1924) – revusical
 Alpine Antics (1924) – revusical
 The Pickled Porter (1924) – revusical
 Off Honolulu (1924) – revusical
 Harmony Row (1924) – revusical
 The Oojah Bird (1924) – revusical
 At the Cross Roads (1924) – revusical
 Lads of the Village (1924) – revusical
 Midnight Revels (1924) – revusical
 Dangerous Dan (1925) – revusical
 Athletic Frolics (1925) – revusical
 Money and Matrimony (1925) – revusical
 The Sparklers (1925) – revusical
 Rising Tides (1926) – revusical
 Night Lights (1926) – revusical
 Happy Moments (1926) – revusical
 Scrambled Fun (1926) – revusical
 His Royal Highness (1927) – revusical
 Married Bliss-ters (1928) – revusical
 Bald Heads (1928) – revusical
 Me and My Girl (1929) – revusical
 S.S. Sunshine (1929) – revusical
 Cinderella (1931) – Melbourne
 Frank Neil Musical Comedy Revue (1932) – Brisbane
 Collits' Inn (1933–34) – musical – Melbourne, Sydney
 Oh What a Night (1933) – revusical
 The Beloved Vagabond (1934) – Melbourne, Sydney
 Business as Usual (1939) – revue – Tivoli Circuit
 The Crazy Show (1940) – revue
 Beauty on Parade (1945) – revue – Melbourne
 Gay Fiesta/Mother Goose (1951) – Adelaide
 Thanks for the Memory (1953–56) – revue – Melbourne, Sydney, Adelaide
 A Night of Pink Champagne (1954) – revue – Melbourne
 The George Wallace Show (1955) – revue – Broken Hill
 Pin Up Parade (1955) – revue
 The Good Old Days (1956–57) – revue – started Sydney then toured to Melbourne, Adelaide, Brisbane and throughout New Zealand, then returning to Sydney

Radio 
 The George Wallace Programme (1942)
 Trial by Music (1948)
 George Wallace's Barn Dance (1949)
 The George Wallace Road Show (1949–50)
 The George Wallace Show (1950–53)

See also 
 Roy Rene
 George Leonard Wallace

References 

Other references
 Bertrand, Ina. Australian Film Studies: Efftee Productions, La Trobe University Centre for the Study of Educational Communication and Media, Bundoora, 1977. .
 Bridges, Nancye. Curtain Call. Cassell. 
 Funny By George: The George Wallace Story, Director Don Percy, Writing Credits Jim Murphy, Australia 1999.
 Pike, Andrew, and Ross Cooper. Australian Film 1900–1977: A Guide to Feature Film Production. Oxford University Press and Australian Film Institute, Melbourne, 1980. .

External links 
 
 George Wallace. Biography at the Australian Variety Theatre Archive.
 George Wallace. Portrait, screenography and film extracts at Australian Screen Online.
 George Wallace. Portrait at Live Performance Australia Hall of Fame.
 George Wallace. Theatre credits at AusStage.
 George Wallace. Collection listing at the National Film and Sound Archive.
 Performers: George Wallace. Portrait at Laughterlog. Includes extensive radio and film lists.
 Wallace, George Stephenson. Biography at AustLit: The Australian Literature Resource.
 Wallace, George Stephenson (1895–1960). Biography at Australian Dictionary of Biography

1895 births
1960 deaths
Australian male comedians
People from New South Wales
Australian film studio executives
20th-century Australian comedians